The Presbyterian Church in Korea (JapDongJungAng) was founded by a group that separated from the JungAng denomination. This group opposed to the practice of ordaining women ministers. They formed a Presbytery, and later a General Assembly. It has 132,000 members and 550 congregations in 25 Presbyteries. The Apostles Creed and the Westminster Confession are generally accepted.

References 

Presbyterian denominations in South Korea